Óscar Eduardo Cabezas Segura (born 22 December 1996) is a Colombian professional footballer who plays as a defender.

Career

Club
Cabezas had youth spells with Club Juanito Moreno and Atlético Paranaense, he didn't make a first-team appearance for either of those two sides but was once an unused substitute for Atlético Paranaense in their October 2015 Campeonato Paranaense match with Coritiba. In January 2017, Patriotas completed the signing of Cabezas. They gave him his professional debut on 9 February during a league victory over Once Caldas. In total, Cabezas featured thiry-four times during the 2017 Categoría Primera A season as the club finished 15th overall. On 24 January 2018, Cabezas was loaned by Rosario Central.

He made his debut in the Argentine Primera División versus Unión Santa Fe on 3 February, prior to scoring his first senior goal on 7 April against Belgrano.

International
Cabezas represented Colombia at U17 level, winning three caps at the 2013 South American Under-17 Football Championship in Argentina.

Career statistics
.

Honours
Rosario Central
Copa Argentina: 2017–18

References

External links

1996 births
Living people
Colombian footballers
Colombia youth international footballers
Association football defenders
Colombian expatriate footballers
Expatriate footballers in Brazil
Expatriate footballers in Argentina
Colombian expatriate sportspeople in Brazil
Colombian expatriate sportspeople in Argentina
Campeonato Brasileiro Série A players
Categoría Primera A players
Argentine Primera División players
Club Athletico Paranaense players
Patriotas Boyacá footballers
Rosario Central footballers
América de Cali footballers
Deportivo Riestra players
People from Tumaco
Sportspeople from Nariño Department